The sixth season of Stargate SG-1, an American-Canadian television series, began airing on June 7, 2002 on Sci Fi. The sixth season concluded after 22 episodes on February 19, 2003 on the UK's Sky One, which had overtaken the Sci-Fi Channel's number of new-episode broadcasts mid-season. The series was developed by Brad Wright and Jonathan Glassner. Season six regular cast members include Richard Dean Anderson, Amanda Tapping, Christopher Judge, Corin Nemec, and Don S. Davis.

Production
"Redemption" features a brand new opening sequence, with various shots of the gate spinning, and Michael Shanks' name being removed to make way for Corin Nemec's in between Christopher Judge and Don S. Davis. The following episode, "Descent", has a different title sequence.

In most of the shots in "Abyss" where Ba'al is talking to O'Neill, Cliff Simon is actually talking to a stand-in for O'Neill and not Richard Dean Anderson due to the limited time Richard Dean Anderson had in which to film the episode. A series of three different sets were used to represent the cells; a horizontal cell, a vertical cell and a pivoting cell for the scenes in which the chamber is seen rotating. A blend of shots filmed in all three sets was used each time O'Neill is retrieved from or returned to his cell.

"Shadowplay" was written as an homage to John Nash, see A Beautiful Mind.

Most of "Paradise Lost" was shot at Pitt Lake, near Vancouver.

"Disclosure" is the third clip show within Stargate SG-1, with the first being "Politics" and the second being "Out of Mind". None of the regular characters except General Hammond are featured.

"The Changeling" was written by Christopher Judge, who plays Teal'c. The parts of the episode where Teal'c is a human take place in Coquitlam, which is a city in the Greater Vancouver Regional District. (Vancouver, the city where Stargate SG-1 is filmed, is also part of this district.)

"Full Circle" is the last episode to feature Corin Nemec as a main cast member. It is also the last episode where Skaara (Alexis Cruz) appears.

"The Other Guys" features several Star Trek references: John Billingsley (Doctor Phlox in Star Trek: Enterprise) plays the part of a scientist named Coombs (reference to actor Jeffrey Combs, a regular on various Star Trek series), one of the actors refers to the "Roddenberry spirit", and a Klingon Bat'leth is mounted on the wall behind the throne of Khonsu of Amon Shek.

Release
Upon its initial airing, "Prometheus" became the Sci Fi channel's highest rated one-hour episode of a series, earning a 2.0 household Nielsen rating.

"Redemption, Part 2" was nominated for a Gemini Award in the category "Best Visual Effects". "Descent" was nominated for a Gemini Award in the category "Best Visual Effects". "Nightwalkers" was nominated for a Gemini Award in the category "Best Photography in a Dramatic Program or Series". "Unnatural Selection" was nominated for a Leo in the category "Dramatic Series: Best Visual Effects". For "Unnatural Selection", Andy Mikita was nominated for a Leo Award in the category "Dramatic Series: Best Director". "Metamorphosis" won a Leo Award in the category "Dramatic Series: Best Make-Up".

Main cast
 Starring Richard Dean Anderson as Colonel Jack O'Neill
 Amanda Tapping as Major Samantha Carter
 Christopher Judge as Teal'c
 With Corin Nemec as Jonas Quinn
 And Don S. Davis as Major General George Hammond

Episodes

Episodes in bold are continuous episodes, where the story spans over 2 or more episodes.

References

External links

 Season 6 on GateWorld
 Season 6 on IMDb
 Season 6 on TV.com
 

 06
2002 American television seasons
2003 American television seasons
SG-1 06
2002 Canadian television seasons
2003 Canadian television seasons